Kinheim is a baseball and softball team based in Haarlem, the Netherlands.  The title sponsor of the club is currently Corendon so that the official name of the team is Corendon Kinheim. 

Kinheim baseball team plays in the Honkbal Hoofdklasse, the top level of professional baseball in the Netherlands. The club's most successful period was in the 1990s when they reached the Holland Series five consecutive times (1992–1996). They lost four of their Holland Series entries, but managed to become Dutch champions in 1994 when beating DOOR Neptunus 3–2. In 2006 Kinheim won the regular Honkbal Hoofdklasse league and the KNBSB-Beker, which is the national cup trophy. By beating Mr. Cocker HCAW in the play-offs they gained themselves entrance to the 2006 Holland Series. They won the series 3–2 against Konica Minolta Pioniers of Hoofddorp.

In 2008, Kinheim won the European Cup in Grosseto, Italy.

Since 2020 Kinheim has fielded a combined team with fellow Haarlem baseball club DSS. Kinheim was unable to qualify for the Hoofdklasse after being relegated in 2019, and DSS was unable to participate in the top league due to financial difficulties. The fusion enabled the combined clubs to continue fielding a team from Haarlem in the Hoofdklasse.

2011 roster

References

External links

 Official website

Sports clubs in Haarlem
Baseball teams in the Netherlands
Softball teams in the Netherlands